The M25 Tank Transporter (G160) was a combination 6x6 M26 armored heavy tank transporter/tank recovery tractor and companion 40-ton M15 trailer introduced into US Army service in Europe in 1944–45.  Manufactured by Pacific Car & Foundry Co., it was a substantial upgrade over the Diamond T M19 transporter/trailer duo introduced in 1940.

Nicknamed the Dragon Wagon, it was replaced by the 10 ton 6x6 M123 semi-tractor beginning in 1955.

Development 
In 1942 a new 40 ton semi-trailer tank transporter was needed with better off-road performance than the M9 24 small-wheel trailer, and greater capacity than the 30 ton 8 large-wheel Shelvoke and Drewry semi-trailers used by the Diamond T tractor unit. Designed by the Fruehauf Trailer Company of Detroit, Michigan, it was heavier than the Diamond T could manage.  A companion M26 tractor was designed by the San Francisco-based Knuckey Truck Company. When it could not keep up with the Army's demands, production was awarded to the Pacific Car & Foundry Co. of Seattle, Washington.

Developed for the M26, it was used to uprate the Diamond T. Some 2,100 Type 440s were built. Baxter notes "over 1,300" M26 and M26A1 being built.

Unusually, the tractor unit was fitted with both an armored cab and two winches with a combined pull of 60 tons, allowing it to do light battlefield recovery work.

A later unarmored version of the M26 tractor was designated the M26A1. An experimental ballast tractor conversion was evaluated by the British Fighting Vehicle Proving Establishment

After the war, some of them (both armored and unarmored) were bought as surplus and used to carry oversize loads such as transformers, locomotives and heavy equipment.

Gallery

Specifications
 Crew 7
 Armament 1 .50 cal. machine gun
 Armor, front 3/4 inch, sides and rear, 1/4 inch.
 Top speed 26 MPH
 Fuel capacity 120 gallons

Users
 : Japan Ground Self-Defense Force
 : British Army
 : United States Army
 : Yugoslav People's Army

See also
Diamond T tank transporter
G160, "G" designation
List of U.S. military vehicles by model number#Pre-consecutive trucks
Pacific Trucks
Scammell Pioneer Semi-trailer

Notes

References 
 TM 9-1767A
 TM 9-1767B Power Train for Tractor Truck M26

Further reading
Military Vehicle Journal #8 (Photos of the M26 and M26A1)

External links

Short story of the M26 and pictures of a restored vehicle in 2004
Article and photo at milweb.net
Scratchbuilt M25 model step-by-step, with pictures and references used
 https://web.archive.org/web/20090204121541/http://realmilitaryflix.com/public/378.cfm training film
 http://www.forum-auto.com/automobile-pratique/modelisme-modeles-reduits/sujet7051-5495.htm pictures of M26 used as oversize loads tractors

Military trucks of the United States
Tank transporters
Wheeled armoured recovery vehicles
World War II vehicles of the United States
Military vehicles introduced from 1940 to 1944
Fruehauf Trailer Corporation